Admaston/Bromley is an incorporated township in Renfrew County, Eastern Ontario, Canada. It was formed on January 1, 2000, when Admaston and Bromley Townships were amalgamated. It takes part of its name from Admaston, Staffordshire, a small English hamlet.

Communities

The township comprises the communities of Admaston, Balsam Hill, Belangers Corners, Bromley, Bulgers Corners, Connaught, Douglas, Ferguslea, Fremo Corners, Kellys Corner, Martins Corner, McDougall, Moores Lake, Mount St. Patrick, Northcote, Oakgrove, Osceola, Payne, Pine Valley, Renfrew Junction, Rosebank, Shamrock, and Wolftown.

The town of Douglas is the third of five chutes along the Bonnechere River. The others being Castleford, Renfrew, Fourth Chute and Eganville. The chutes used were for moving timber past rapids and waterfalls.

Demographics

See also
 List of municipalities in Ontario
List of townships in Ontario

Notes

References

External links

Lower-tier municipalities in Ontario
Municipalities in Renfrew County
Township municipalities in Ontario